Kim Brown (2 May 1945 – 11 October 2011) was a British-born, Finland and Italy-based musician, best known as the founder, lead singer and guitarist of the band The Renegades, which reached their greatest success during the 1960s.

Life and career
Brown was born in Birmingham, England, but lived much of his life in Finland from 1964, where he made a career in rock music. In later years, he played with such musicians as Hasse Walli and Markus Raivio. The Renegades recorded four albums in Finland. The tribute album, Moments with Kim Brown (2005), was made after Brown lost his voice in a cancer operation.

Brown wrote many of the #1 songs for The Renegades, played guitar and was the lead vocalist of the band. 
He moved to Italy in 1966 with The Renegades, and from 1975, he created a 1950s-styled classic rock'n'roll combo called Kim & The Cadillacs, featuring German guitarist Trutz 'Viking' Groth and former Renegade Mick Webley, which took the late seventies 1950s craze heralded by shows such as Happy Days and the movie Grease by storm. Kim & The Cadillacs had regular chart success in Italy between 1976 and 1982, and were regulars on all kinds of national television shows there, including Discoring and Festival di Sanremo, only to become quickly forgotten when new musical tendencies arrived in the early 1980s, finally splitting up in 1988.
Kim Brown then returned to Finland, though visiting Italy occasionally for guest appearances on oldies shows or at dance hall gigs in resort towns. The music of the Renegades was heavily featured in the 1994 Finnish film Take Care of Your Scarf, Tatiana directed by Aki Kaurismäki; this also included clips from some of their live performances from the 1960s.

Kim Brown died of esophageal cancer in Helsinki, Finland, aged 66, on 11 October 2011.

Discography

The Renegades
The albums recorded in Finland.
The Renegades - 1965
The Renegades - 1965
The Cadillac - 1965
Take a Heart - 1965

Kim & The Cadillacs
Rock'N'Roll - 1977 
Kim & The Cadillacs - 1978
On The Rocks - 1978
Rock Bottom - 1980
Cadillac's Corn - 1981
Boogie - 1982
Cadillacs Eldorado Dance - 1982
Size 50 - 1984
On The Rocks - 1985
1986 - 1986

References

External links

All singles and albums by The Renegades

1945 births
2011 deaths
English rock guitarists
British rock singers
English emigrants to Finland
Finnish people of English descent
Finnish women musicians
Deaths from cancer in Finland
Deaths from esophageal cancer
Musicians from Birmingham, West Midlands